Mads Fogh (born September 19, 1988) is a Danish professional football player.

External links
Vejle Boldklub profile

References

Living people
1988 births
Danish men's footballers
Vejle Boldklub players
Kolding IF players

Association football forwards